The City Hall Square Building was a 79-meter (259 ft) tall building located on North Clark Street in Chicago, Illinois, United States. It was completed in 1912 however was destroyed and replaced in 1965 by the Richard J. Daley Center.

It had 21 floors and was located opposite Chicago City Hall. When in use, it was an office building built in the classical style. Ornamental stone cladding was used for the upper façade and the lower 4 floors while the mid-façade was brick. It was designed by Christian A. Eckstorm.

External links
 Emporis.com: Building ID - 102670

Demolished buildings and structures in Illinois
Former buildings and structures in Chicago
Skyscraper office buildings in Chicago
Government buildings completed in 1912
1912 establishments in Illinois
1965 disestablishments in Illinois
Buildings and structures demolished in 1965